Ólafur Jónsson (born 7 December 1949) is an Icelandic former handball player who competed in the 1972 Summer Olympics.

References

1949 births
Living people
Olafur Jonsson
Olafur Jonsson
Handball players at the 1972 Summer Olympics